Le Cours is a commune in the Morbihan department of Brittany in north-western France.

Geography
The river Arz forms all of the commune's southern border.

Demographics
Inhabitants of Le Cours are called in French Coursiens (male) or Coursiennes (female).

See also
Communes of the Morbihan department

References

External links

Le Cours, Questembert Communauté 
 Mayors of Morbihan Association 

Communes of Morbihan